Xiao Junfeng (born July 12, 1979 in Xi'an, Shaanxi) is a Male Chinese gymnast. Xiao was part of the Chinese team that won the gold medal in the team event at the 2000 Summer Olympics in Sydney.

Major performances
1995 National Inter-city Games - 3rd vaulting horse
1997 World Championships - 1st team
1997 National Games - 1st vaulting horse
1999 National Championships - 1st team
1999 National Champions Tournament - 1st vaulting horse
2000 World Cup Series Switzerland leg - 1st vaulting horse
2000 International Gymnastics Grand Prix - 1st vaulting horse
2000 National Championships - 1st vaulting horse

References

 - China Daily

1979 births
Living people
Gymnasts at the 2000 Summer Olympics
Chinese male artistic gymnasts
Olympic gymnasts of China
Olympic gold medalists for China
Olympic medalists in gymnastics
Sportspeople from Xi'an
Shenzhen University alumni
Medalists at the 2000 Summer Olympics
Medalists at the World Artistic Gymnastics Championships
Gymnasts from Shaanxi
20th-century Chinese people
21st-century Chinese people